Uruguayan Jews in Israel are Jewish immigrants and descendants of the immigrants of the Uruguayan Jewish communities, who now reside within the state of Israel.

Modern estimates put the figure of Uruguayan Jews in Israel at around 15,000.

See also
 History of the Jews in Uruguay
 Aliyah from Latin America in the 2000s
 Jewish ethnic divisions
 Israel–Uruguay relations

References

 

Israeli Jews by national origin
 
 
 
South American-Jewish culture in Israel